The Baptist College of Florida is a private Baptist College in Graceville, Florida. It is affiliated with the Florida Baptist Convention (Southern Baptist Convention).

History
It was founded in 1943 and is a cooperating ministry of the Florida Baptist Convention. It was originally focused on training Baptist ministers but now offers degrees in theology, music, counseling, education, and business.  It is nationally accredited by the National Association of Schools of Music and regionally accredited by the Southern Association of Colleges and Schools.

Accreditation 
It is affiliated with the Florida Baptist Convention.

References

External links
Official website

Baptist Christianity in Florida
Baptist College of Florida
Educational institutions established in 1943
Universities and colleges accredited by the Southern Association of Colleges and Schools
Education in Jackson County, Florida
Private universities and colleges in Florida
1943 establishments in Florida